Cayes-Jacmel is a commune in the Jacmel Arrondissement, in the Sud-Est department of Haiti.
It has 36693 inhabitants. Cayes-Jacmel is down the road from Cyvadier and home to a lovely public beach and has a remarkable farmers market (Wednesdays and Saturdays). The town is also home to amazing artists and artisans, including work in meticulously created miniature ships. The region's hydroelectric plant (running on a stream only a few inches deep) is nearby.

Demographic 
The commune is inhabited by  personas (2009 estimate).

History 
The town of Cayes-Jacmel was founded in 1714.

Administration 
The commune is made up of 4 sections:
 Ravine-Normande
 Gaillard
 Haut-Cap-Rouge
 La Selle de Fond-Melon

Monuments and sites 
Fort Ogé is part of around 20 military installments, built on the Haitian territory after the 1804 independence: a defensive system aimed to stop a possible return of the French, former owners of the Saint-Domingue colony. The Fort Ogé was built under the direction of general Magloire Ambroise. The ruins of the fort are located inside the commune section of  Cap-Rouge. Its name reminds of Vincent Ogé, one of the main protagonists of the Haitian Revolution.

See also
Jean Bellande Joseph Foundation

References

External links
 Official Cayes-Jacmel Website

Populated places in Sud-Est (department)
Communes of Haiti